Savithri Lakshmanan is an Indian National Congress politician from Thrissur in Kerala state, India. She was the member of Lok Sabha from Mukundapuram (Lok Sabha constituency) in 1989 and 1991. She was also the member of Kerala Legislative Assembly in 1996.

References

1945 births
Living people
Politicians from Thrissur
India MPs 1989–1991
India MPs 1991–1996
Lok Sabha members from Kerala
Women members of the Kerala Legislative Assembly
Indian National Congress politicians from Kerala
Kerala MLAs 1996–2001
20th-century Indian women politicians
20th-century Indian politicians
21st-century Indian women politicians
21st-century Indian politicians